Tatiana Grigorievna Solomakha (1892 – 7 November 1918) was a Russian revolutionary of Cossack origin, a Bolshevik and a participant in the Russian Civil War and the establishment of Soviet power in the Kuban. Solomakha was captured by the White Guards and killed along with 19 others on 7 November 1918, making her one of the victims of the White Terror.

Early life 
Solomakha was born into the family of a rural teacher in the village of Poputnaya. She studied at the women's gymnasium in Armavir, and after graduating in 1910 began working as a teacher. The same year, Solomakha's father was fired from his school when he was deemed unreliable by a priest. As the eldest child, Solomakha became the family breadwinner.

Revolutionary activity 
Solomakha was a participant in the First Russian Revolution of 1905 at age 17. During World War I, Solomakha became a fully-formed revolutionary and actively worked among front-line soldiers returning to the village. In 1916, she became a member of the Russian Social Democratic Labour Party, and in the February Revolution of 1917 she spoke at meetings and meetings and campaigned for the Bolsheviks. The following year, Solomakha joined the Red Army in the midst of the Russian Civil War.

At the first meeting of the Revolutionary Committee, Solomakha was appointed Commissar for Food Supplies. In the fall of 1918, the Red Army men retreated from Poputnaya along with Solomakha. Near Stavropol, she fell ill with typhus. While sick, she was captured during the night by the White Guards at the Blagodarny farm, near the village of Kazminsky. She was forcibly returned to the village of Poputnaya, Solomakha, along with other sick Red Army men, was thrown into prison. For three weeks, the prisoners were beaten with ramrods and whips, while being pressured into changing sides. During one of the torture sessions Solomakha exclaimed:

The Soviets are coming soon, and your days are numbered. Our blood will not be shed in vain… Soviet power cannot be killed!

On the night of 7 November 1918, Solomakha and her comrades were executed. Solomakha was killed last, first, they cut off her hands, then her legs, then her head.

Personal life 
Solomakha was a bibliophile. One of her favorite books was Ethel Voynich's novel The Gadfly. She read other revolutionary works; Solomakha first became acquainted with the works of Vladimir Lenin after a student who spent the night in her house gave her a book, on the cover of which was written “Lenin”.

Family 
She came from a revolutionary family. Her mother, Natalia Semyonovna Solomakha, was killed by the White Guards on 7 November 1918. Her brothers, Nikolai G. Solomakha and Grigory G. Solomakha, were executed in Mozdok. Her sister was Raisa G. Solomakha and her father was Grigory Solomakha.

Notes

References

Footnotes

Bibliography

External links 
 Tatiana SolomakhaHouse-Museum of the village of Poputnaya.

People of the Russian Civil War
Communist Party of the Soviet Union members
Russian revolutionaries
1918 deaths
1892 births
Female revolutionaries